was a Japanese mathematician.  A world-renowned expert in functional equations, he is best known for discovering "Haruki's theorem" and "Haruki's Lemma" in plane geometry.

Some of his published work, such as: "On a Characteristic Property of Confocal Conic Sections"  is available (open source) on Project Euclid.

Haruki earned his MSc and PhD from Osaka University and taught there. He was a professor at the University of Waterloo in Canada from 1966 till his retirement in 1986.  He was a founding member of the university's computer science department (1967).

See also
 List of University of Waterloo people

References 

News release, Department of Computer Science, University of Waterloo.

External links
 Haruki's theorem on MathWorld
 Hiroshi Haruki's Lemma (Interactive Mathematics Miscellany and Puzzles)
 Hiroshi Haruki's Theorem (Interactive Mathematics Miscellany and Puzzles)

Year of birth missing
1997 deaths
Euclidean geometry
Canadian mathematicians
20th-century Japanese mathematicians
Academic staff of the University of Waterloo
Osaka University alumni